Adam Deja (born 24 June 1993) is a Polish professional footballer who plays as a midfielder for Ekstraklasa side Korona Kielce.

Career statistics

Club

References

1993 births
Living people
People from Olesno
Sportspeople from Opole Voivodeship
Polish footballers
Association football midfielders
Ekstraklasa players
I liga players
II liga players
Górnik Zabrze players
MKS Kluczbork players
Podbeskidzie Bielsko-Biała players
MKS Cracovia (football) players
Arka Gdynia players
Korona Kielce players